The 2000 San Diego mayoral election was held on Tuesday, November 7, 2000 to elect the mayor for San Diego. Incumbent mayor Susan Golding was ineligible to run for reelection due to term limits.

Municipal elections in California are officially non-partisan, though some candidates do receive funding and support from various political parties. The non-partisan primary was held Tuesday, March 7, 2000. County supervisor Ron Roberts and superior court judge Dick Murphy received the most votes and advanced to the November general election. Murphy was elected mayor with a majority of the votes in the November runoff election.

Candidates

Dick Murphy, superior court judge (Voter registration: Republican)
Ron Roberts, San Diego County supervisor and mayoral candidate in 1992 (Voter registration: Republican)
Peter Q. Davis, banker (Voter registration: Republican)
Barbara Warden, San Diego City Council member (Voter registration: Republican)
George Stevens, San Diego City Council member (Voter registration: Democratic)
Byron Wear, San Diego City Council member (Voter registration: Republican)
Jim Bell, environmental designer (Party Preference: Democratic)
Janice Jordan (Party Preference: Peace and Freedom Party)
Loch David Crane
Glen D. Adkins
Robert H. Schmitt
Jim Hart, aircraft mechanic and perennial candidate (Voter registration: Republican)

Campaign
With incumbent mayor Susan Golding termed out and ineligible to run, the primary election attracted a crowded field of candidates. Despite Democrats in San Diego holding 39% to 36.5% lead in registered voters, all but one of the candidates considered serious contenders by the media were Republicans. Many of the candidates had ties to Pete Wilson, the former mayor of San Diego, U.S. senator, and California governor. County supervisor Ron Roberts advanced to the November runoff with 25% of the primary vote. He was joined by Superior Court Judge Dick Murphy, who narrowly defeated banker Peter Q. Davis for second place and a place in the runoff with 15% of the vote.

Due to his advantages in fund raising, endorsements, political experience and his comfortable lead in the primary election Roberts was initially considered the front runner. However, Murphy was able to pull even by campaigning as an incorruptible political independent compared to his "career politician" opponent. Sports also played a large role in the general election campaign, including controversy over a deal where the city agreed to pay the San Diego Chargers for unsold tickets and city participation in the financing of a new stadium for the San Diego Padres.

Murphy ultimately defeated Roberts 52% to 48% and was elected mayor.

Primary election results

General election results

References

2000 United States mayoral elections
2000
2000
2000 California elections